John Morgan Williams  (born 25 March 1943) is a New Zealand ecologist and agricultural scientist who served as the Parliamentary Commissioner for the Environment from 1997 to March 2007.

Educated at Rangiora High School, Williams obtained a MSc from the University of Canterbury, studying biology and ecology, and then studied at the University of Bath where he completed a PhD in population ecology.  He worked in Antarctica and Fiji before returning to New Zealand where he worked for the Ministry of Agriculture and Fisheries in research, management and policy for 21 years. In January 1996, he joined Agriculture New Zealand Limited, a Wrightson Group company, and the following year he was appointed New Zealand's second Parliamentary Commissioner for the Environment.

Williams joined the board of WWF-New Zealand in 2009 and was elected chair in 2012, serving in that role until May 2019.

In the 2020 New Year Honours, Williams was appointed a Companion of the Queen's Service Order, for services to the State and the environment.

References

Living people
Alumni of the University of Bath
New Zealand ecologists
University of Canterbury alumni
1943 births
People educated at Rangiora High School
Officers of the Parliament of New Zealand
Companions of the Queen's Service Order
New Zealand public servants